The American dark comedy-drama series Weeds was created by Jenji Kohan and aired on premium cable channel Showtime. Mary-Louise Parker stars as Nancy Botwin, a suburban widow who begins selling marijuana to support her family. Elizabeth Perkins also starred as Nancy's neighbor, Celia Hodes, a manic PTA mother, but Perkins departed the series at the end of the fifth season. The show follows a serialized format and details Nancy's progressively deeper involvement in illegal activity as she takes care of her family.

The ten-episode first season premiered on August 8, 2005 and concluded on October 10, 2005. Season two, which comprises 12 episodes, began airing on August 14, 2006 and finished its run on October 30, 2006. The series' third season received an order of 15 episodes, premiered on August 13, 2007 and ran until November 19, 2007. The 13-episode fourth season premiered early the following summer on June 16, 2008 and concluded on September 15, 2008. Seasons one, two and three have been released on DVD and Blu-ray Disc formats in Regions 1, 2 and 4. At the 2008 Television Critics Association, it was announced that Weeds had been picked up for fifth and sixth seasons of 13 episodes each. An eighth and final season premiered on July 1, 2012 and concluded September 16, 2012.

At the completion of the sixth season, Jenji Kohan remarked that, "In my mind, it is [the last season]. Everyone's contract is up next year, [including] the actors and mine. Seven years is a good run, and I'd rather leave while on top." However, halfway through the seventh-season run, Showtime Entertainment president David Nevins remarked that he is "optimistic" that the show will be renewed. Kohan also expressed hope that the show would be renewed. Regardless of renewal, the seventh-season finale was crafted to "stand up on its own as a series finale if it has to or be a prelude to an eighth season." An eighth season was announced in November 2011, almost two months after the seventh-season finale. On June 13, 2012, it was announced that season eight would be the final season.

Weeds has steadily gained live viewers from season to season. The first season premiered to 540,000 viewers and averaged 380,000 viewers to become Showtime's highest-rated original series in 2005. Season two averaged 160,000 more viewers than season one after 570,000 viewers tuned in to the premiere; the finale received 626,000 viewers. The third season's debut was watched live by 824,000 viewers and the finale by 737,000 such that viewership was up 19% from the second season. Season four premiered to 1.3 million live viewers to become what was at the time "Showtime's most-watched single original telecast in at least four years." The first airing of the finale was watched by one million viewers and multiple airings of episodes throughout the week after their initial broadcasts averaged 2.72 million viewers—16% more than the third.

A total of 102 episodes of Weeds were broadcast over eight seasons, with the series finale airing on September 16, 2012.

Series overview

Episodes

Season 1 (2005)

Season 2 (2006)

Season 3 (2007)

Season 4 (2008)

Season 5 (2009)

Season 6 (2010)

Season 7 (2011)

Season 8 (2012)

Notes

References

External links 
 
 

Episodes
Lists of American comedy-drama television series episodes